The year 1705 in science and technology involved some significant events.

Astronomy
 Edmond Halley, in his Synopsis Astronomia Cometicae, states that comets seen in 1456, 1531, 1607, and 1682 were actually a single comet and correctly predicts that it will return in 1758.

Life sciences
 Dutch lepidopterist Maria Merian publishes Metamorphosis insectorum Surinamensium.
 French anatomist Raymond Vieussens publishes Novum vasorum corporis humani systema, considered an early classic work on cardiology.
 French surgeon Jean Louis Petit publishes L'Art de guerir les maladies des os, the first significant work on bone disease.

Other events
 April 16 – Isaac Newton is knighted by Anne, Queen of Great Britain.

Births
 February 22 – Peter Artedi, Swedish naturalist (died 1735)
 April 11 – William Cookworthy, English chemist (died 1780)
 June 21 – David Hartley, English physician and psychologist (died 1757)
 undated – Charles Labelye, Swiss engineer (died c. 1781)
 undated – Thomas Boulsover, English inventor (died 1788)
 undated – Faustina Pignatelli, Italian mathematician (died 1785)

Deaths
 January 17 – John Ray, English naturalist (born 1627)
 August 16 – Jakob Bernoulli, Swiss mathematician (born 1654)
 October 11 – Guillaume Amontons, French scientific instrument inventor and physicist (born 1663)
 November 10 – Justine Siegemund, German midwife (born 1636)

References

 
18th century in science
1700s in science